Athanasios Vouros was a Greek fencer.  He competed at the 1896 Summer Olympics in Athens. He was born in Athens.

Vouros competed in the foil event. He placed second of four in his preliminary group after winning his match against Georgios Balakakis, losing to Eugène-Henri Gravelotte, and winning by forfeit against Konstantinos Komninos-Miliotis.  Because he had only won one actual bout, Vouros was considered to have won fourth place behind Perikles Pierrakos-Mavromichalis, who had placed second in his preliminary group but had won two bouts without forfeits. However, nowadays appears as having won also the third place and a bronze medal.

References

External links

Year of birth missing
Year of death missing
Fencers at the 1896 Summer Olympics
19th-century sportsmen
Olympic fencers of Greece
Greek male fencers
Olympic bronze medalists for Greece
Olympic medalists in fencing
Medalists at the 1896 Summer Olympics
Sportspeople from Athens
Place of death missing